Whispering Corridors is a 1998 South Korean supernatural horror film directed and co-written by Park Ki-hyung. It was part of the explosion in South Korean cinema following the liberalization of censorship in the aftermath of the end of the country's military dictatorship. The film makes a social commentary on authoritarianism and conformity in the harsh South Korean education system.

This film is the first installment of the Whispering Corridors film series, and was followed by five sequels (Memento Mori, Wishing Stairs, Voice, A Blood Pledge and The Humming), though none of the sequels share a continuing plot or characters with each other.

Plot
In an all-female high school in South Korea, the Jookran High School for Girls, a homeroom teacher Mrs. Park, nicknamed "Old Fox" due to her sadistic method of teaching, circles several points in the students' yearbooks and calls her new fellow teacher, (also her former student) Hur Eun-young, telling her that "Jin-ju, is definitely dead, but still attending school."

Moments later, she is strangled with a noose by an unknown figure, her body discovered by three new senior students: the talented, superstitious artist Lim Ji-oh; the timid outsider, Yoon Jae-yi; and the sullen, unpopular Kim Jung-sook. Their new replacement teacher is the cruel, abusive Mr. Oh, nicknamed "Mad Dog", who likes to give corporal punishments to his students, as well as harass the class' top student, Park So-young.

The discovery of Mrs. Park's body deeply impacts Ji-oh, so she creates a painting of the body, which earns her a horrible punishment by Mr. Oh. Seeing Ji-oh dispirited, Jae-yi, a former artist, agrees to teach her painting in the storage room, which is rumored to be haunted. Ji-oh discovers that So-young goes there to hide her smoking habit.

Eun-young suspects that Ji-oh may be a ghost, since she carries bells that Jin-ju, her best friend from high school, had given her, but Ji-oh tells her that they were given to her by Jae-yi. One night, Mr. Oh is terrorized by Jin-ju and stabbed to death. The next night, Ji-oh encounters Jung-sook and So-young bickering, ending with So-young storming out. Jung-sook commits suicide in a manner similar to Mrs. Park's: hanging herself by a noose.

So-young tearfully reveals to Eun-young that she used to be close to Jung-sook, but the teachers started comparing them and they drifted apart, with Jung-sook growing bitter and withdrawn. While painting, Ji-oh discovers a bust created by Eun-young for Jin-ju, as well as Mr. Oh's body. A flashback shows how Jin-ju died in the storeroom while trying to save the statue; as it fell, she tripped, and everything came crashing down, including the sculpting knives, which ultimately killed her.

Eun-young learns from the yearbooks that since then, Jin-ju has entered the school every three years, posing as false students. She is currently posing as Jae-yi. Eun-young is confronted by an enraged Jae-yi/Jin-ju. Before Jin-ju can kill her, Ji-oh arrives and pleads with her to end the bloodshed and rest in peace. Jin-ju says that all she wanted was to live a normal high school life and have someone who could love her fearlessly as Eun-young couldn't. Jin-ju disappears after Ji-oh and Eun-young promise that they will correct the misgivings and that they will never forget her. Blood appears to run down the walls while Eun-young and Ji-oh, exhausted, sit in the room, with Ji-oh resting her head in Eun-young's lap.

Eun-young and Ji-oh are still in the classroom the next day when they are observed by a student. The girl leaves upon seeing the two, but as she turns around, it is revealed that she is Jung-sook's ghost.

Cast

Production
With the rise of Korean film industry, a demand for commercially oriented films was made. Horror films were generally absent from South Korea throughout the 1980s and due to the genres low production costs, it led to independent companies such as Cine 2000 to work in the genre. Whispering Corridors cost US$600,000 to make and was completed with only 28 set-ups.

Release
Whispering Corridors was released on May 30, 1998 in South Korea. It was a surprise hit in South Korea, where it ranked third in the highest grossing domestically produced films of the year. The film was only beaten by A Promise and The Letter. The film was followed by five sequels: Memento Mori (1999), Wishing Stairs (2003), Voice (2005), A Blood Pledge (2009) and The Humming (2021).

In October 2015, it was announced that a Chinese-language remake of Whispering Corridors was in development and to be directed by Zhen Qin. Production is set to be handled by Beijing-based Beautiful Creative Force Culture Media, October Pictures’ Seoul branch, and the original franchise's production house Cine2000. The film was set for a 2016 release.

In 2020, Peter Bradshaw of The Guardian ranked Whispering Corridors number 10 in a list of classics of modern South Korean cinema.

Notes

References

External links 
 
 
 
 Transcript of Whispering Corridors
 Interview with director Park Ki-hyung

1998 horror films
1990s supernatural horror films
South Korean supernatural horror films
1990s high school films
South Korean ghost films
Films directed by Park Ki-hyung
1990s Korean-language films
1998 films
South Korean high school films
1998 directorial debut films